Patricia Emonet (born 23 July 1956) is a French former alpine skier who competed in the 1976 Winter Olympics.

External links
 sports-reference.com

1956 births
Living people
French female alpine skiers
Olympic alpine skiers of France
Alpine skiers at the 1976 Winter Olympics
FIS Alpine Ski World Cup champions
Place of birth missing (living people)